The Maleshevo Mountain (Maleshevska planina) or Maleševo Mountain (Maleševski Planini), is situated in southwestern Bulgaria and eastern North Macedonia.  It is the third of the five mountains of the Osogovo-Belasitsa mountain group, known also as the Western Border Mountains.  The highest point is Ilyov Vrah (1,803 m).

In Bulgarian territory the mountain represents an elongated structure with area of 497 km2.  It has rich wildlife which includes many Mediterranean flora and fauna species.  There are two nature reserves to protect the varied wildlife.

Maleshevo Cove on the north coast of Livingston Island in the South Shetland Islands, Antarctica is named after “the Maleshevo region in Southwestern Bulgaria.”

See also 
 Maleševci

Notes

Mountains of Bulgaria
Mountains of North Macedonia
Landforms of Blagoevgrad Province
Bulgaria–North Macedonia border
Rhodope mountain range